Babcock House may refer to:

Dr. Raymond Babcock House, Willits, California, listed on the National Register of Historic Places (NRHP) in Mendocino County
Simeon Babcock House, Manistee, Michigan, listed on the NRHP in Manistee County
Capt. Francis Babcock House, Absecon City, New Jersey, listed on the NRHP in Atlantic County
Dr. John Babcock House, Selkirk, New York, listed on the NRHP
Babcock-Shattuck House, Syracuse, New York, listed on the NRHP in Onondaga County
Charles C. Babcock House, Oregon City, Oregon, listed on the NRHP in Clackamas County 
Babcock House (Charlestown, Rhode Island), listed on the NRHP
Babcock-Smith House, Westerly, Rhode Island, listed on the NRHP
Babcock-Macomb House, Washington, D.C., listed on the NRHP
Weston-Babcock House, Necedah, Wisconsin, listed on the NRHP in Juneau County
Havilah Babcock House, Neenah, Wisconsin, listed on the NRHP in Winnebago County

See also
Babcock Block, Worcester, Massachusetts, listed on the NRHP in Worcester County
Babcock Building, South Carolina State Hospital, Columbia, South Carolina, listed on the NRHP
Babcock Site, Waldron, Missouri, listed on the NRHP in Platte County